The Mennonite Quarterly Review is an American interdisciplinary review journal, devoted to Anabaptist and Mennonite history, theology, and contemporary issues.

History, circulation and operations
Published continuously since its conception in 1927 by Harold S. Bender and the Mennonite Historical Society, the journal is now a cooperative publication along with Goshen College and the Associated Mennonite Biblical Seminary.

As the first North American journal for and about Mennonites, its older issues contain a wealth of historical materials about their life and theology. It includes articles on the Radical Reformation, Amish, Mennonites and Hutterites, as well as reviews of recent publications and research notes.

As of January 2004, the journal had a total circulation of over 1,000 copies, with 870 paid subscriptions. The total circulation in 1956 was approximately 600.

Notable contributors

 Theron Schlabach
 John Howard Yoder

Editors

 Harold S. Bender, 1927–1962
 Guy F. Hershberger, 1963–1965
 John S. Oyer, 1966-1974 and 1977-1992
 Walter Klaassen, 1975-1976
 Theron F. Schlabach, 1993-1994 
 John D. Roth, 1995 to present

See also

 List of history journals
 List of theology journals

References

External links 
 , the journal's official website

1927 establishments in Indiana
Academic journals published in the United States
English-language journals
Goshen College
Mass media in Indiana
Mennonitism in the United States
Anabaptism in Indiana
Publications established in 1927
Quarterly journals
Religion history journals
Review journals